Alexey Morosov (born September 26, 1974) is a Russian sculptor and painter. He is a graduate of the Moscow School of Painting, Sculpture and Architecture, where he studied under Lev Kerbel. He has been the director of the  since 2013. He has been a member of the Russian Academy of Arts since 2014. He lives and works in Lucca, Italy.

Collections and Exhibits

His work is held in the collection of the State Russian Museum and the Museum of the New Academy of Fine Arts of St. Petersburg.

PONTIFEX MAXIMVS, exhibited in Naples and Moscow (2016-17). Morosov’s work is notably appreciated for an association with antiquity in particular the use of the Caryatid.

Public Works 
A monument to the founders of the Moscow Art Theatre, Konstantin Stanislavski and Vladimir Nemirovich-Danchenko,  created by Morosov in bronze and granite was inaugurated in 2014 adjacent to the theatre.

Exhibitions 
  2002  -  Magos , Vicenza, Italy 
  2003  -  Craft Deco Academic , New Academy, St. Petersburg.
  2003  -  Craft Deco Classic , Gallery D137, St. Petersburg.
  2004  -  Constantinopolis , Design Center ArtPlay, Moscow.
  2011  -  Antologia , State Russian Museum, St. Petersburg. 
  2012  -  Cariatide Supersonic , Piazza Bra, Verona, Italy.
  2014  -  Morosov MMXIV , Heritage Gallery, Moscow.
  2015  -  Cantata iTunes , Pietrasanta, Italy.
  2015  -  Moscow Biennale, Moscow.  
  2016  -  Pontifex Maximvs , National Archaeological Museum of Naples, Naples, Italy.
  2017  -  Pontifex_Maximvs / Le Stanze , Moscow Museum of Modern Art, Moscow.

References

1974 births
Living people
Russian male sculptors
Russian male painters
21st-century Russian painters
21st-century Russian male artists
21st-century Russian sculptors
Full Members of the Russian Academy of Arts
Moscow School of Painting, Sculpture and Architecture alumni